Crestuma is a former civil parish in the municipality of Vila Nova de Gaia, Portugal. In 2013, the parish merged into the new parish Sandim, Olival, Lever e Crestuma. The population in 2011 was 2,621, in an area of 4.68 km².

References

 	

Former parishes of Vila Nova de Gaia